Martin Klein may refer to:

Martin Klein (footballer) (born 1984), Czech international footballer
Martin Klein (wrestler) (1884–1947), Estonian wrestler
Martin A. Klein, historian of the Atlantic slave trade
Martin J. Klein (1924–2009), American science historian
R. Martin Klein, American voice actor
Marty Klein, art professor